Novorossiysk was a conventionally powered aircraft carrier (heavy aircraft cruiser in Russian classification) that served the Soviet Navy and the Russian Navy from 1982 to 1993. She was the third  vessel to be built. She was designed to engage in offensive actions as a guided missile cruiser mostly using her deck mounted missiles as well as support anti-submarine and surface actions with her embarked air group.

History

Novorossiysk was laid down at the former Soviet Black Sea Shipyard in Mykolaiv, Ukraine, on 30 September 1975, launched on 24 December 1978, commissioned on 12 September 1982, and decommissioned in June 1993.  The third ship in her class, she served in the Soviet Pacific Fleet.

In March 1985, Novorossiysk and escorting battle group departed the Sea of Japan, sailed to the south of Okinawa and then east across the Pacific. After approximately eight days, the ships turned and headed northwest toward the Kuril Islands, simulating an enemy carrier strike against the Soviet Union. A U.S. Navy description of the Novorossisysk exercise notes that "The force was hit by simulated air strikes and probably by submarines firing torpedoes and cruise missiles from 1,120km east of Japan, on 14 April. They came at it with submarines and aircraft--everything they had." The Novorossiysk made its last voyage in mid-1991 just before the break-up of the Soviet Union.

In 1995 the Novorossiysk hulk, which had suffered a serious engine room fire two years back, was sold for scrapping, and was broken up in 1997 at Pohang, South Korea.

See also
 Soviet battleship Novorossiysk (1949–1955), former Italian battleship Giulio Cesare 
 List of aircraft carriers of Russia and the Soviet Union

References

External links

 Kiev Class Aircraft Carriers

Kiev-class aircraft carriers
Ships built at the Black Sea Shipyard
1978 ships
Cold War aircraft carriers of the Soviet Union
Ships built in the Soviet Union